The black flying squirrel or large black flying squirrel (Aeromys tephromelas) is a species of rodent in the family Sciuridae. It is found in Brunei, Indonesia, and Malaysia; its habitat is primary and secondary forests and gardens where it uses tree hollows. It feeds on fruits, nuts and other vegetable matter. It is likely not threatened and is adaptable to habitat loss. Black flying squirrels tend to have smaller populations than other squirrels because female black flying squirrels breed infrequently and have a small litter size of just one young.

References

Thorington, R. W. Jr. and R. S. Hoffman. 2005. Family Sciuridae. pp. 754–818 in Mammal Species of the World a Taxonomic and Geographic Reference. D. E. Wilson and D. M. Reeder eds. Johns Hopkins University Press, Baltimore.
Jackson, S. 2012. Gliding Mammals of the World. Collingwood, Australia: CSIRO Publishing.

Aeromys
Rodents of Malaysia
Rodents of Indonesia
Mammals of Brunei
Mammals of Borneo
Mammals described in 1873
Taxa named by Albert Günther
Taxonomy articles created by Polbot